"Heavy Is the Head" is a song recorded by American country music group Zac Brown Band. It was released on March 6, 2015 as the second single from the band's fourth studio album, Jekyll + Hyde, released on April 28, 2015. It features vocals from Chris Cornell, and was released to rock radio, rather than country.

The song was used as the theme for the 2015 Major League Baseball season and has also appeared in the video game WWE 2K16.

Personnel
Compiled from liner notes.

 Zac Brown – lead vocals, electric guitar
 Chris Cornell – duet vocals
 Coy Bowles – slide guitar
 Clay Cook – Hammond organ
 Donald Dunlavey – electric guitar
 Chris Fryar – drums
 John Driskell Hopkins – electric guitar
 Matt Mangano – bass guitar, electric guitar
 Daniel de los Reyes – percussion
 Jimmy De Martini – violin
 Darrell Scott – background vocals, electric guitar, pedal steel guitar

Chart performance
"Heavy Is the Head" debuted at number 50 on the Billboard Rock Airplay chart and at number 37 on the Mainstream Rock airplay chart for the week ending March 21, 2015. The song is the band's first entry on either chart. Its number one peak on the Mainstream Rock airplay chart has made Zac Brown Band only the second musical act after Bon Jovi to have a number one single on both that chart and the Country Airplay chart.

Weekly charts

Year-end charts

References

2015 songs
2015 singles
Chris Cornell songs
Zac Brown Band songs
Big Machine Records singles
Republic Records singles
Songs written by Darrell Scott
Songs written by John Driskell Hopkins
Songs written by Zac Brown
Songs written by Wyatt Durrette (songwriter)
Vocal collaborations